The 	Sangihe dwarf kingfisher (Ceyx sangirensis) is a species of bird in the family Alcedinidae that is endemic to the Sangihe Islands, Indonesia. 

Its natural habitat is subtropical or tropical dry forests. It is threatened by habitat loss.

References

Birds described in 1898
Ceyx (bird)